Lilakoi Moon (born Lisa Michelle Bonet; November 16, 1967), known professionally as Lisa Bonet, is an American actress. She portrayed Denise Huxtable on the sitcom The Cosby Show (1984–1992), for which she earned widespread acclaim and a nomination for the Primetime Emmy Award for Outstanding Supporting Actress in a Comedy Series in 1986; she reprised the role of Denise in the spinoff series A Different World (1987–1993). 

She also appeared in the psychological horror film Angel Heart (1987), which earned her a nomination for the Saturn Award for Best Supporting Actress. Bonet has starred in the action thriller film Enemy of the State (1998), the comedy-drama film High Fidelity (2000), the action drama film Biker Boyz (2003) and the thriller film Road to Paloma (2013). She has sporadically worked in TV acting, appearing in roles such as Maya Daniels in Life on Mars (2008–2009) and Marisol on Ray Donovan (2016).

From 1987 to 1993, Bonet was married to singer-songwriter Lenny Kravitz, with whom she had one child, Zoë, who is also an actress. In 2017, she married actor Jason Momoa, with whom she has two children. Bonet and Momoa announced their separation in January 2022.

Early life
Lisa Michelle Bonet was born on November 16, 1967, in San Francisco, California, to Arlene Joyce Litman, a schoolteacher of Jewish descent, and Allen Bonet, an opera singer of African-American heritage from Texas. She has five half-sisters, including singer Kadhja Bonet, and two half-brothers by her father's marriage to Deborah Church. Bonet graduated from Birmingham High School, in Van Nuys, California and later studied acting at the Celluloid Actor's Studio in North Hollywood.

Career
After being in beauty competitions and appearing in guest spots on television series as a child, Bonet landed the role of Denise Huxtable on The Cosby Show, the second-oldest child of the parents played by Bill Cosby and Phylicia Rashad. In 1987, she briefly left The Cosby Show to star in the spin-off series A Different World, which focused on Denise's life at college. That year, Bonet, then 19, played 17-year-old Epiphany Proudfoot in the movie Angel Heart opposite Mickey Rourke. In the film, several seconds of an explicit scene she shared with Rourke (filmed when she was 18) were edited to ensure an R rating. For Angel Heart, Bonet earned a nomination for the Saturn Award for Best Supporting Actress. It was followed by a topless centerspread in Interview magazine.

In 1986, Bonet earned a nomination for the Primetime Emmy Award for Outstanding Supporting Actress in a Comedy Series. After announcing her pregnancy during the run of A Different World, Bonet left the series. She returned to The Cosby Show the following year, but was fired in April 1991 because of "creative differences". After The Cosby Show, Bonet appeared in direct-to-video releases and made-for-television movies. In September 1992, Bonet hosted Why Bother Voting?, an election special focusing on young voters' concerns and apathy. She had supporting roles in the 1998 film Enemy of the State and the 2000 film High Fidelity. In 2003 she played Queenie in Biker Boyz, which reunited her with her A Different World co-star Kadeem Hardison.

Bonet co-starred in the film Whitepaddy in 2005. While she did not have another film role until 2014's  Road to Paloma, she did make a number of appearances in episodes of television dramas and comedies, starting in 2008 in the American adaptation of the British television series Life on Mars. She had a recurring role in the 2014–15 series The Red Road, starring her partner and future husband Jason Momoa.

Personal life
On November 16, 1987, her 20th birthday, Bonet eloped with American rock singer Lenny Kravitz in Las Vegas. Bonet recalled of their relationship: "It was interesting when we were first finding out about each other, that our backgrounds were so similar. When I first told him my mom was Jewish, and he said "So's my dad," I thought that was both unusual and enchanting. I felt like, "Okay, here's someone who really knows how it is." And I think I trusted him a little more with my feelings and let him inside a little more than I ordinarily would have." Bonet gave birth to their daughter Zoë Isabella Kravitz on December 1, 1988. She and Kravitz divorced in 1993.

In 1993, she legally changed her name to Lilakoi Moon, although she still uses the name Lisa Bonet professionally.

In 2005, Bonet began a relationship with actor Jason Momoa. They married in October 2017. Bonet and Momoa have two children: a daughter born in July 2007, and a son born in December 2008. In January 2022, Momoa and Bonet announced their separation.

Filmography

Film

Television

Music videos

Awards and nominations

References

Further reading

External links
 
 

African-American actresses
American film actresses
American television actresses
Jewish American actresses
1967 births
Living people
American child actresses
African-American Jews
Actresses from Los Angeles
Actresses from San Francisco
People from the San Fernando Valley
People from Topanga, California
20th-century American actresses
21st-century American actresses
Birmingham High School alumni
20th-century African-American women
20th-century African-American people
21st-century African-American women
21st-century African-American people
21st-century American Jews